Acellalis is a genus of moths of the family Crambidae. It contains only one species, Acellalis iridialis, which is found in Indonesia (Ambon Island).

References

Pyraustinae
Monotypic moth genera
Moths of Indonesia
Crambidae genera
Taxa named by Arnold Pagenstecher